Ham's tissue culture medium is a growth medium for mammalian cells.

Contents
It contains in amounts dissolved in 1 liter of triple distilled water:

L-Arginine  211 mg
Biotin  0.024 mg
L-Histidine  21 mg
Calcium pantothenate  0.7 mg
L-Lysine  29.3 mg
Choline chloride  0.69 mg
L-Methionine  4.48 mg
i-inositol  0.54 mg
L-Phenylalanine  4.96 mg
Niacinamide  0.6 mg
L-Tryptophan  0.6 mg
Pyridoxine hydrochloride  0.2 mg
L-Tyrosine  1.81 mg
Riboflavin  0.37 mg
L-Alanine  8.91 mg
Thymidine  0.7 mg
Glycine  7.51 mg
Cyanocobalamin  1.3 mg
L-Serine  10.5 mg
Sodium pyruvate  110 mg
L-Threonine  3.57 mg
Lipoic acid  0.2 mg
L-Aspartic acid  13.3 mg
CaCl2  44 mg
L-Glutamic acid  14.7 mg
MgSO4·7H2O  153 mg
L-Asparagine  15 mg
Glucose  1.1 g
L-Glutamine  146.2 mg
NaCl  7.4 g
L-Isoleucine  2.6 mg
KCl  285 mg
L-Leucine  13.1 mg
Na2HPO4  290 mg
L-Proline  11.5 mg
KH2PO4  83 mg
L-Valine  3.5 mg
Phenol red  1.2 mg
L-Cysteine  31.5 mg
FeSO4  0.83 mg
Thiamine hydrochloride  1 mg
CuSO4·5H2O  0.0025 mg
Hypoxanthine  4 mg
ZnSO4·7H2O  0.028 mg
Folic acid  1.3 mg
NaHCO3  1.2 g

See also
Biotechnology
Brewing
Cell biology
DMEM Dulbecco's Modified Eagle's Medium
Eagle's minimal essential medium (a minimum ingredient cell culture medium)
Fermentation (food)
GMEM (Glasgow's Minimal Essential Medium)
Murashige and Skoog medium (Plant cell culture medium)
RPMI (Roswell Park Memorial Institute medium), for lymph cells

References

Further reading 
The Nutrient Requirements of Cells

Cell biology